Roberta Howett (born 26 September 1981 in Dublin, Ireland) is an Irish singer who finished in ninth place in the first UK series of television talent show The X Factor in 2004.

The X Factor: 2004
Howett successfully auditioned for the first series of The X Factor in 2004 and made it to "bootcamp", "judges' houses" and the live shows, but was eliminated in the first live show.

Performances on The X Factor
 Last 9 - "Superstar" by The Carpenters (Eliminated)

Solo career

In 2007, Howett sang on Toni Castells's debut album, Unharmed.

She announced on Irish Radio that she would release three singles in Ireland, before finally releasing her debut album. On Friday 26 February 2010, her debut single titled "Beautiful Lies" was finally released in Ireland. On Thursday 4 March 2010, Beautiful Lies became Howett's first Top 40 single debuting at Number #23 in the Irish Singles Chart.

In July 2011, Howett appeared as a backing singer for Niall Breslin.

Discography

Singles

References

External links

Irish women singer-songwriters
The X Factor (British TV series) contestants
1981 births
Living people
Singers from Dublin (city)
21st-century Irish women singers